Vladas Mironas  (22 June 1880 in Kuodiškiai, Kovno Governorate – 18 February 1953 in Vladimir) was a Lithuanian priest, politician and later Prime Minister of Lithuania.

In 1905, Mironas participated in the Great Vilnius Seimas and, in 1917, the Vilnius Conference. He was elected to the Council of Lithuania and became its second vice-chairman. Later he left politics and worked as a priest.

After the coup d'état in 1926, he was elected to the 3rd Seimas, and after couple of years again returned to priesthood. 1938 he was offered to become the Prime Minister of Lithuania representing Lithuanian Nationalists Union. In 1941 he was arrested and imprisoned, being freed a few days later by the Lithuanian Activist Front. Arrested again in 1945, he was forced to collaborate with NKVD and worked in Vilnius. As his collaboration with NKVD proved not to be satisfactory, Mironas was arrested yet again in 1947 and subsequently sent to Vladimir Prison, where he died in 1953.

References 
 "Mironas, Vladas". Encyclopedia Lituanica III: 545–546. (1970–1978). Ed. Simas Sužiedėlis. Boston, Massachusetts: Juozas Kapočius. LCCN 74-114275.

1880 births
1953 deaths
People from Rokiškis District Municipality
People from Novoalexandrovsky Uyezd
Prime Ministers of Lithuania
Members of the Council of Lithuania
Lithuanian independence activists
20th-century Lithuanian Roman Catholic priests
Lithuanian people of World War II
Lithuanian people who died in prison custody
Lithuanian people who died in Soviet detention
Burials at Rasos Cemetery